Mitochondrial carrier homolog 2 also known as MTCH2 is a protein which in humans is encoded by the MTCH2 gene.

MTCH2 resides on the outer mitochondrial membrane where it co-localizes with the apoptotic Bcl-2 family protein BID.

Clinical significance 

MTCH2 assists in the recruitment of BID into the mitochondria during apoptosis.

Variants of the MTCH2 gene may be associated with obesity. MTCH2 represses mitochondrial metabolism such that a deficiency of MTCH2 increases energy consumption and production by mitochondria.

See also 
 Mitochondrial carrier

References

Further reading